A full stop is a form of punctuation to end a sentence.

Full Stop may also refer to:

Music 
 Full Stop (album), a 2000 album by Annabelle Chvostek
 "Full Stop" (G.E.M. song) (2019)
 "Full Stop" (IU song) (2017)
 "Full Stop", a song by Frank Klepacki
 "Ful Stop", a song by Radiohead from A Moon Shaped Pool

Other uses
 Full stop law, an Argentine law passed in 1986 to stop prosecution of people accused of political violence
 Full Stop, a campaign by the National Society for the Prevention of Cruelty to Children
 Full stop, an increment of factor of two  of a camera lens aperture area

See also
 Period (disambiguation)